The Coriolan Overture, Op. 62, is a composition written by Ludwig van Beethoven in 1807 for Heinrich Joseph von Collin's 1804 tragedy Coriolan.

The structure and themes of the overture follow the play very generally. The main C minor theme represents Coriolanus' resolve and war-like tendencies (he is about to invade Rome), while the more tender E-flat major theme represents the pleadings of his mother to desist. Coriolanus eventually gives in to tenderness, but since he cannot turn back having led an army of his former enemies to Rome's gates, he kills himself. (This differs from the better-known play Coriolanus by William Shakespeare, in which he is murdered. Both Shakespeare's and Collin's plays are about the same semi-legendary figure, Gaius Marcius Coriolanus, whose actual fate was not recorded.)

The overture was premiered in March 1807 at a private concert in the home of Prince Franz Joseph von Lobkowitz. The Symphony No. 4 in B-flat and the Piano Concerto No. 4 in G were premiered at the same concert.

Scoring 
The Coriolan Overture is scored for 2 flutes, 2 oboes, 2 clarinets in B, 2 bassoons, 2 French horns in E, 2 trumpets in C, timpani, and strings.

Recordings

Two of the most highly regarded recordings are of Wilhelm Furtwängler conducting the Berliner Philharmoniker (1943) and Fritz Reiner conducting the Chicago Symphony Orchestra in 1959. Sir Roger Norrington has created a notable period performance version with his recording of the overture with the London Classical Players.

Other notable recordings include those of Otto Klemperer with the Philharmonia Orchestra, Herbert von Karajan with the Berlin Philharmonic, Karl Böhm with the Vienna Philharmonic, Carlos Kleiber conducting the Bavarian State Orchestra, Christopher Hogwood with the Academy of Ancient Music, and Bruno Walter conducting the Columbia Symphony. The work was a staple of Arturo Toscanini's repertoire, and six recordings under Toscanini's baton are extant as well as one recording of rehearsal excerpts.

Notes

References

Sources
 Joseph Kerman/Alan Tyson, "Ludwig van Beethoven", Grove Music Online, ed. L. Macy (Accessed 21 August 2007), (subscription access)

External links
  (includes original manuscript)
 
 
 

Compositions by Ludwig van Beethoven
Overtures
1807 compositions
Compositions in C minor